Silver Arrow may refer to:

 The Pierce Silver Arrow, a luxury car introduced in 1933
 Frecciargento (Italian for SilverArrow), the brand name for 200-250 km/h Italian high speed trains
 Silver Arrow (rail-air service), a former intermodal passenger transport service between London and Paris
 Silverpilen, The Silver Arrow, a legendary ghost train that haunts the Stockholm Metro
 Silver Arrow, a division of Elbit Systems that builds unmanned aerial vehicles
 Zilverpijl (Silver arrow), Belgian comic book series about the American Old West
 Silver Arrow, a limited dealer edition of the Saab 900

Other
 Silver Arrows, nickname given by the press to Germany's dominant Mercedes-Benz and Auto Union Grand Prix motor racing cars between 1934 and 1939

See also
 Arrow (disambiguation)
 Black Arrow (disambiguation)
 Blue Arrow (disambiguation)
 Golden Arrow (disambiguation)
 Green Arrow (disambiguation)
 Pink Arrow (disambiguation)
 Red Arrow (disambiguation)
 White Arrow (disambiguation)
 Yellow Arrow (disambiguation)